Wellington Electricity, registered as Wellington Electricity Lines Limited, is an electricity distribution company, based in Wellington, New Zealand.

Wellington Electricity supplies electricity to approximately 400,000 consumers through over 164,500 installation connection points (ICPs) in its network that covers the Wellington city, Porirua and the Hutt Valley regions.

Ownership
Cheung Kong Infrastructure Holdings Limited and Power Assets Holdings Limited together own 100 per cent of Wellington Electricity, with both companies being members of the Cheung Kong group of companies and listed on the Hong Kong Stock Exchange (HKEx).

Distribution network

Wellington Electricity uses a 33 kV sub-transmission network, with 11 kV high-voltage distribution and 230/400 V low-voltage distribution. The network comprises a high percentage of underground cabling, with 66% of the sub-transmission circuits being cabled. Wellington Electricity also owned and operated several rectifier stations and a 53 km network of DC cables in central Wellington to supply the trolleybus system, which was closed down and removed in 2017.

The majority of electricity used in Wellington is taken from the national grid at Transpower substations located at Upper Hutt (Birchville), Haywards, Melling, Gracefield, Pauatahanui, Takapu Road (to the east of Linden), Kaiwharawhara, Wilton and Central Park (Mount Cook). The network also receives up to 12 MW of electricity from power generating facilities connected to the distribution network, including two landfill gas stations at Silverstream and Happy Valley, a gas fired cogeneration facility at Wellington Hospital, and a single wind turbine in Brooklyn.

A major project was completed in 2012 to replace 33 kV underground cables that supply part of the Wellington Central Business district. New cables were installed from Wilton to Moore Street in Thorndon.

Network statistics

Network performance
The Wellington Electricity 2016 Information Disclosure reported the performance of the network for the 2015/16 year as follows:

This level of network performance means that average consumer typically experiences a power outage lasting 55 minutes once every 20 months.  However, Wellington is subject to severe storm events and high wind gusts that can cause extensive interruptions for some consumers. Normalised figures are exclusive of major weather events and outages.

History
The ownership of Wellington Electricity has changed significantly since the early 1990s. At the start of the 90s, the Wellington City Council Municipal Electricity Department (MED) and the Hutt Valley Electric Power Board (HVEPB) merged their electricity assets. In 1992, the passing of the Energy Companies Act required that the various franchised electricity distribution and retailing organisations then operating in New Zealand become commercial power companies with a responsibility to operate as a successful business. Two new companies were formed, Capital Power and Energy Direct respectively.

In 1996, the Canadian owned power company TransAlta acquired both companies to form a consolidated Wellington electricity distribution network business. The  Electricity Industry Reform Act was passed in 1998, and this required that all electricity companies be split into either the lines (network) business or the supply business (generating and/or selling electricity) by 1 April 1999. Ownership of the lines network was passed to United Networks in 1998, which Vector acquired in 2003.

In July 2008, the network was purchased by Cheung Kong Infrastructure Holdings Limited and Hong Kong Electric Holdings Limited to create Wellington Electricity. Hong Kong Electric Holdings Limited changed its name on 16 February 2011 to Power Assets Holdings Limited.

See also
 Electricity sector in New Zealand

References

External links
 Wellington Electricity website

Electric power distribution network operators in New Zealand
Wellington Region